Carmine Marcantonio (born 21 November 1954 in Castel di Sangro, Italy) is a Canadian retired soccer player who earned two caps for the national team between 1976 and 1980.

Club career 
Marcantonio played in the National Soccer League (NSL) in 1973 with Toronto Italia for three seasons. In 1976, he played in the North American Soccer League (NASL) with Toronto Metros-Croatia, where he won the Soccer Bowl. The following season he returned to play with Toronto Italia. in 1978, he returned to the NASL to play with the Washington Diplomats. The remainder of his tenure in the NASL he played with Montreal Manic and New York Cosmos. In the summer of 1985, he returned to the NSL to play with Toronto Dinamo. 

He played one season of indoor soccer for the New York Arrows of the Major Indoor Soccer League and several indoor seasons for NASL clubs. 

He was a member of Canadian Soccer Hall of Fame class of 2014.

International career 
He made his debut for Canada on September 24, 1976 against the United States in a 1–1 draw in a World Cup qualifier in Vancouver. His second and final cap came in a 2–1 win against the Americans in a World Cup qualifier four years later in Vancouver.

Managerial career 
Marcantonio served as the head coach for the North York Rockets in the Canadian Soccer League.

References

External links
 / Canada Soccer Hall of Fame
 NASL/MISL career stats

1954 births
Living people
Canadian expatriate sportspeople in the United States
Canadian expatriate soccer players
Canada men's international soccer players
Canada Soccer Hall of Fame inductees
Canadian soccer players
Expatriate soccer players in the United States
Association football midfielders
Italian emigrants to Canada
Major Indoor Soccer League (1978–1992) players
Montreal Manic players
Naturalized citizens of Canada
New York Arrows players
New York Cosmos players
North American Soccer League (1968–1984) players
North American Soccer League (1968–1984) indoor players
Sportspeople from the Province of L'Aquila
Toronto Italia players
Toronto Blizzard (1971–1984) players
Washington Diplomats (NASL) players
Canadian National Soccer League players
People from  Castel di Sangro